Eat That Question: Frank Zappa in His Own Words is a 2016 documentary film about Frank Zappa. It incorporates clips from various interviews, concerts, movies, and previously unseen footage pertaining to Frank Zappa.

Reception

Critical reception
Eat That Question has received mostly positive reviews from critics. Review aggregator Rotten Tomatoes gives the film an approval rating of 91%, based on 69 reviews, with an average rating of 7.3/10. The website's critical consensus reads, "Eat That Question: Frank Zappa in His Own Words offers an illuminating primer for Zappa novices as well as an entertaining retrospective for diehard fans." On Metacritic, the film has a score of 74 out of 100, based on 22 critics, indicating "generally favorable reviews".

References

External links
 
 

2016 films
2016 documentary films
American documentary films
Documentary films about rock music and musicians
Sony Pictures Classics films
2010s English-language films
2010s American films